Early Summer is the debut EP by Chicago punk rock band Tuesday. It was released on July 15, 1997, on Asian Man Records. Before this they had a demo available at shows, but this was their first official release. The cover art features guitarist Matt Stamps, in a situation where he ends up breaking his arm. AllMusic describes the EP as holding a more punk rock sound compared to the emo inspired songs on the Freewheelin' album.

Track listing

References

1997 debut EPs
Punk rock EPs
EPs by American artists